Mundelein is a station on Metra's North Central Service in Mundelein, Illinois. In Metra's zone-based fare system, Mundelein is in zone H. As of 2018, Mundelein is the 148th busiest of Metra's 236 non-downtown stations, with an average of 276 weekday boardings. Service began on August 19, 1996, but the building was not completed until 1997. The parking lot was expanded later. As with other North Central stations, there is no ticket agent and no weekend service to this station. In addition to train service, it is used for parking for Carmel High School "Street Scenes," and for occasional electronic waste disposal events.

As of December 12, 2022, Mundelein is served by all 14 trains (seven in each direction) on weekdays.

Bus connections
Pace
 572 Washington 
 574 CLC/Hawthorn Mall

References

External links 

Metra stations in Illinois
Railway stations in Lake County, Illinois
Mundelein, Illinois
Railway stations in the United States opened in 1996
Former Soo Line stations